"Overdrive" is a song by American singer-songwriter, Katy Rose from her debut studio album, "Because I Can"(2004). It was released to radio as the lead single from the album on July 28, 2003, by V2 Records. The song was written by Rose and Kim Bullard, whilst production was helmed solely by Bullard. According to Rose, the song is about feelings of angst and self-discovery that she experienced as a teenager. "Overdrive" was featured on the soundtrack to the teen comedy film Mean Girls (2004).

Writing and inspiration
"Overdrive" was written by Rose, at the age of fourteen in collaboration with her father, Kim Bullard. The New York Times described the song as a "paean to the beauty and beastliness of growing up too fast in Southern California." In an interview with Affinity, Rose stated that the song acted as a "cathartic little capsule for the angst and self-discovery I was blasting off into as a teenager in LA".

Critical reception
Aaron Latham of AllMusic criticized the song, stating that "it is unfortunate that the production style [of the album] is so hooked into the angry teen girl sound of the moment that it makes an interesting song like the single 'Overdrive' sound banal". Sal Cinquemani of Slant Magazine described the song as "catchy," stating that it is "a trite condemnation of Californication".

Music video
The music video was directed by Sophie Muller in California.

Use in media
The song was used in the films Thirteen and Mean Girls. Also used in the TV series Laguna Beach: The Real Orange County, One Tree Hill and Joan of Arcadia.

Track listings and formats
European and United States CD single
"Overdrive"  – 2:53
"Lemon"  – 4:42

Australian CD single
"Overdrive"  – 2:52
"Lemon"  – 4:40
"Overdrive" (Video) – 3:07
"EPK" – 4:54

Digital download
"Overdrive" (So Wylie Remix) – 2:21
"Overdrive" (2021 Version) – 3:08
"Overdrive" (Stripped) – 3:17
"Overdrive" (Original Demo) – 2:03

Charts

Release history

References

2003 debut singles
Music videos directed by Sophie Muller
Songs written for films
Songs written by Kim Bullard
2003 songs
V2 Records singles
Rykodisc singles
Festival Records singles